The Miss Ecuador 1991 was held on March 12, 1991. There were 14 candidates for the national title. In the end of the night, Jéssica Núñez from Guayas crowned Diana Neira from Guayas as Miss Ecuador 1991. Miss Ecuador competed at Miss Universe 1991.

Results

Placements

Special awards

Contestants

Casting

A casting was held in 1991 to select the Ecuadorian representative to compete at Miss World 1991.

Notes

Withdraws

 Cotopaxi
 El Oro
 Esmeraldas

External links

Miss Ecuador
1991 beauty pageants
Beauty pageants in Ecuador
1991 in Ecuador